Return to Evermore is the seventh studio album by the melodic hard rock band Ten, released  in 2004. It was the first Ten album with the lead guitarist Chris Francis, who replaced Vinny Burns two years before the release of the album.

Track listing
All songs written by Gary Hughes.
 "Apparition" – 8:34
 "Dreamtide" – 6:29
 "Evermore" – 4:37
 "Sail Away" – 5:12
 "Temple of Love" – 4:46
 "Even the Ghosts Cry" – 5:52
 "Strangers in the Night" – 5:19
 "Evil's on Top in the World" – 4:31
 "The One" – 5:33
 "Lost Soul" – 5:29
 "Stay a While" – 4:42
 "Tearing My Heart Out" – 5:42
Asian version (Avalon Records MICP-10444) adds
"It's You I Adore" – 3:38

Personnel
Gary Hughes – vocals
Chris Francis – lead guitars
John Halliwell – rhythm guitars
Steve McKenna – bass guitar
Paul Hodson – keyboards
Greg Morgan – drums and percussion
Pete Coleman – English pipes (track 3)
Jason Thanos – backing vocals

Production
Mixing – Pete Coleman
Engineers – Gary Hughes, Roger Smith and Jason Thanos
Additional engineering – Pete Coleman, Billy Churchill and Mark Sumner

References

External links
 
Heavy Harmonies page
Powermetal.dk review

Ten (band) albums
2004 albums
Albums produced by Gary Hughes
Frontiers Records albums